In the Shadow of Eagles (original title All'ombra delle aquile) is a 1966 sword-and-sandal film written and directed by Ferdinando Baldi and starring Cameron Mitchell and Beba Lončar.

Plot
Emperor Tiberius is warned of the threat posed by the Germanic tribes revolting in the northern province of Pannonia. Tribune Marcus Vinditius is entrusted with the insignia of the 7th Legion and ordered by Governor Messala to subdue the rebellion.  Magdus, the aging leader of the Pannonian tribes, is angry with Batone because he has compromised the peace terms with Rome, but Batone is a much younger warrior who has lost his reason and lusts for blood.

Cast
 Cameron Mitchell as Marcus Venditius
 Dieter Eppler as Publius  
 Aleksander Gavrić as Batone 
 Paul Windsor  as Messala 
 Remo De Angelis as Publius 
 Vladimir Medar as Magdus 
 Beba Lončar as Helen 
 Gabriella Pallotta as Julia 
 Peter Carsten 
 Beli Bolin

See also
Massacre in the Black Forest (dir. Ferdinando Baldi, 1967), with Cameron Mitchell, Beba Lončar, Dieter Eppler, Peter Carsten

References
1. Roberto Poppi, Mario Pecorari. Dizionario del cinema italiano. I film. Gremese Editore, 2007. 

2. Patrick Lucanio. With Fire and Sword: 
Italian spectacles on American screens, 1958 - 1968. Scarecrow Press. 1994.

Biography 
 Hughes, Howard (2011). Cinema Italiano - The Complete Guide From Classics To Cult. London - New York: I.B. Tauruis. .
 Roberto Poppi, Mario Pecorari. Dizionario del cinema italiano. I film. Gremese Editore, 2007, .
 Patrick Lucanio. With fire and sword: Italian spectacles on American screens, 1958 - 1968. Scarecrow Press 1994. .

External links 

In the Shadows of the Eagles on TMD

1966 films
Italian adventure drama films
Films set in ancient Rome
Films directed by Ferdinando Baldi
1960s Italian-language films
1960s Italian films
Peplum films
Cultural depictions of Tiberius